Politics of Ladakh is exercised within democratic setup of the Indian-administered union territory of Ladakh. Major power centres are Ladakh Autonomous Hill Development Council, Leh and Ladakh Autonomous Hill Development Council, Kargil alongside Ladakh Lok Sabha constituency. Indian National Congress and Bharatiya Janata Party are major political parties. Ladakhi religious organisations like Ladakh Buddhist Association, Imam Khomeni Memorial Trust and Anjuman-e-Jamiat-ul-Ulama Asna Asharia have major influences as well.

History

After collapse of Namgyal dynasty of Ladakh, Ladakh became part of the princely state of Jammu and Kashmir before the Dogra–Tibetan War. After 1947, Ladakh continued to be part of Indian state of Jammu and Kashmir. Ladakh Union Territory Front was formed demanding Ladakh to be formed separate Union territory. Ladakh was created as separate union territory in 2019 with celebrations in Leh.

Political parties of Ladakh
Major political parties are:
Indian National Congress (Congress)
Bharatiya Janata Party (BJP)
National Conference (NC)
Bahujan Samaj Party (BSP)
Aam Aadmi Party (AAP)

See also
Politics of India
Politics of Jammu and Kashmir
Politics of Himachal Pradesh
Administration of Ladakh
Ladakh Police

References

 

Politics of Ladakh